The first season of the Brazilian competitive reality television series MasterChef premiered on September 2, 2014 at 10:30 p.m. on Band.

Executive producer Elisa Fernandes won the competition over chemical engineer Helena Manosso on December 16, 2014.

Contestants

Top 48
The green concursants are the winners

Top 16

Elimination table

Key

Ratings and reception

Brazilian ratings
All numbers are in points and provided by IBOPE.

 In 2014, each point represents 65.000 households in São Paulo.
Note: Episode 7 aired on Wednesday, October 15, due to the second round Presidential debate on Band on Tuesday, October 14.

References

External links
 MasterChef on Band.com
 

2014 Brazilian television seasons
MasterChef (Brazilian TV series)